Thycaud Ayyavu Swamikal (1814 – 20 July 1909)  was a spiritualist and a social reformer, the first to break customs related to caste in Kerala when caste restrictions and untouchability were at its extreme.

Biography

Ayyavu Swamikal was born in 1814 in Nakalapuram in Tamil Nadu. His original name was Subharayan. His parents were Mutthukumaran and Rugmini Ammal. His father and grandfather Sri Hrishikesan were scholars and experts in yoga and spiritual sciences.(Ayyaavu means Father)

At the age of twelve, Subharayan received spiritual initiation from two Tamil Saints, Sachidananda Maharaj and Sri Chitti Paradeshi who used to visit his father. They told his family that his life has a specific assignment, he is destined to serve humanity at another place and that when it is time they would come and take him to mould him to fulfil his duty. These avadhutas are said to be connected to great siddhas from Tamil Nadu living in Himalayas who knew the science of immortality. When he was 16, the two siddhas took him with them to Palani where he learned advanced yoga. He travelled with them to Burma, Singapore, Penang and Africa. With them he met teachers of many religions and saints. Subbarayan mastered English during his stay and travel with them. He also acquired proficiency in English, Siddha medicine and alchemy during his wanderings with the siddhas.

At the age of nineteen he was sent back home with instructions to look after his parents and brethren. At home he continued worshiping Goddess and yogic practices, often entering the state of Samadhi. His biographers and disciples state that by this time he had acquired the Ashtasiddhies or divine powers including that of astral travel. Occasionally he visited Pazhani, Chennai and other religious places as part of pilgrimages for participating scholarly discussions going on there. He also started writing and composed 'Brahmothara Khandam' and 'Pazani Vaibhavam'. At the age of 27, as suggested by his gurus he visited Kodungalloor Devi Temple in Kerala. It is said that his devotion was so deep and his prayers were so strong that when he recited the keerthans the temples bells rang by themselves and the doors opened to give him darsan.

Once in a dream Goddess told him that she will appear before him at Trivandrum and he went there during the period of Swathi Tirunal Maharaja. The king came to know of his scholarship and expertise in Sivaraja Yoga and invited him to the palace and also learned many things from him. One day while a family gathering related to a marriage was going on at the house where he stayed a very old lean women told him that someone will be coming to meet him from his village and asked him to go to the traveller's shed near by on that night. The Goddess gave darsan to him at that travellers' shed that night. Later Thycaud Devi Temple was constructed at this site. Before long he went back to Tamil Nadu.

Within a few months his father left to Kasi. The whole responsibility for the family fell on his shoulders and he started a business to support his family. In accordance with the direction of his guru, Subbarayan got married. He used to deliver spiritual discourses at Chennai. As part of his business he was supplying goods to military camp in Chennai, where he came in contact with a British official Mr. McGregor. McGregor became fond of this English speaking Tamil villager and established a friendship with him. He was interested in Indian religion, language and culture and he became his student. During the reign of Maharaja Ayillyam Thirunal, McGregor became the Resident of Travancore. When the selection of a manager for Residency came he appointed him as the Manager of his Residency in Thycaud in 1873. As this post was one of the senior most offices that the British allowed to natives, people respectfully called him 'Superintend Ayyavu'. The term 'Ayyavu' means a respectable or venerable person. Gradually when people understood his yogic powers and scholarship the name changed from Superintend Ayyavu to Ayyavu Swami. Swami kept strict discipline in work and was extremely punctual.

 Ayyavu used to deliver lectures on Bhakthi, Yoga and Vedanta in Jnanaprjagaram; where the leading literary, social and spiritual personalities in and around Trivandrum used assemble discuss and deliver lectures and discourses. He in association with Manonmaniam Sundaram Pillai, founded the Saiva Prakasha Sabha of Trivandrum.

He already knew that he had to permanently withdraw from this objective world and enter into Samadhi on that day. When the King knew about his approaching Samadhi he wanted to provide a place for Samadhi near the palace and construct a temple there. But Ayyavu insisted that his Samadhi should be in the Thycaud cremation ground and should be a very simple and small structure. Ayyavu Swami attained Samadhi on 20 July 1909. A Shivalinga was installed over the Samadhi site of Ayyavu Swami in Thycaud in 1943. This temple was improved under the patronage of Sri Chithira Thirunal Maharaja the last king of Travancore. This is now known as Thycaud Siva Temple.

Works

Ayyavu wrote several books on Bhakthi, Jnana and Yoga in Sanskrit, Tamil and Malayalam. A few were later published by his disciples. The works that could be identified as his are:

Brahmotharakandom
Pazhanidaivam
Ramayanam Pattu
Utjaini Mahakali Pancharatnam
Thiruvarur Murukan
Kumara Kovil Kuravan
Ulloor Amarntha Guhan
Ramayanam Sundarkandom
Hanuman Paamalai
Ente Kasiyathra
Pazhani vaibhavam

Disciples

Ayyavu Swamikal was instrumental in shaping the personalities of many spiritual, cultural and social leaders of erstwhile Travancore in late nineteenth and early twentieth centuries. Ayyavu demonstrated by his own life how realisation of the Supreme Self  is possible even for ordinary people through practising Siva Raja Yoga. The greatness of what he taught is that realisation is possible even while leading family life and carrying out one's worldly duties.Chattampi Swami, Narayana Guru who contributed much for the modernisation  of Kerala were his disciples. Ayyavu Swami had about fifty disciples consisting of people from diverse fields and castes extending from palace to huts, Nambuthiries, Nairs, Ezhavas, Nadars, Princesses, administrators, doctors, engineers, Muslims, Christians, Hindus and the like. The following are important disciples:

Spiritual Masters and Reformers- Hindu: Chattampi Swami, Narayana Guru, Swayamprakasa Yogini Amma (Kulathoor), Kollathamma. Muslim: Makkadi Labba, Thakkala Peermuhammad. Christian: Petta Fernandez.
Social and Political Leaders: Ayyankali.
Kings, Administrators: Swathi Tirunal Maharaja, Mc Gregor (British Resident), Surya Narayana Iyer, Muthukumara Swami Pillai, Vailur Rayasam Madhavan Pillai and Periya Perumal Pillai, Sundaram Iyyenkar (Peshkars/administrators).
Artists and men of Letters: Raja Ravi Varma (Painter), Kerala Varma Koithampuran, and A.R. Rajaraja Varma (Literature),
Padmanbhan Vaidyan (Musician).

Predictions

Ayyguru Swamikal was a good astrologer and had also the siddhi to predict future events. His predictions that the younger Maharanis' son will become the last Maharaja, that North India will get separated, Ayyankali will be nominated to a participative administrative body to help the downtrodden, the day of his Samadhi etc. became true. Ayyankali was nominated to Sri Moolam Assembly and was honoured by the Rulers and later his statue was unveiled by Prime Minister Indira Gandhi. Maharaja Chithira Tirunal was also the last King of Travancore as he predicted. Swami also attained Samadhi on the date, he predicted. India got separated into India and Pakistan about fifty years after his prediction.

Philosophy

Ayyavu Swamikal was an adept of  'Siva Raja Yoga', an ancient technique practised by Tamil Saiva Yogis like Agasthyar, Bhogar and their line. He was one of the great teachers of Sivaraja Yoga in modern times. He belonged to the line of Tamil Siddhas consisting of Agasthyar, Bogar, Tirumular, Tirujnana Sambhandhar, Manikka vachakar etc. His disciples Chattampi Swami, Narayana Guru, Swayam Prakasini Amma, and others continued that line.

He taught his disciples the principles of Advaitha, and the practice of one God, one religion and one caste. He proclaimed that  'Intha Ulakathile Ore Oru Matham, Ore Oru Jathy, Ore Oru Kadavul Than'. (One caste, one religion and one god in this world). This teaching influenced Chattampi Swami and Narayana Guru. Guru translated this doctrine into Malayalam- 'Oru jathy, oru matham, oru daivam manushyanu' which got a magical charm and helped to remove caste difference from the mind of the people of Kerala. The movements initiated by Ayyavu Swami and his disciples are more based on Humanism, Rationalism and Democracy based on universal love rather than the European model of Renaissance or Reformation.

See also (Social reformers of Kerala) 

 Sree Narayana Guru 
 Dr. Palpu
 Kumaranasan
 Rao Sahib Dr. Ayyathan Gopalan
 Brahmananda Swami Sivayogi
 Vaghbhatananda
 Mithavaadi Krishnan
 Moorkoth Kumaran

 Ayyankali
 Chattampi Swamikal
 Ayya Vaikundar
 Pandit Karuppan

References

1814 births
1909 deaths
Indian social reformers
Advaitin philosophers
19th-century Hindu philosophers and theologians
Malayali Hindu saints
Prophets
Scholars from Thiruvananthapuram
Indian independence activists from Kerala
19th-century Indian philosophers